Whipple is a surname. Notable people with the surname include: 

Abraham Whipple (1733–1819), American Revolutionary War naval commander
A.B.C. Whipple (1918–2013), American journalist, editor, historian and author
Allen Whipple (1881–1963), American surgeon
Amiel Weeks Whipple (1818–1863), American military engineer and surveyor
Beverly Whipple, American author, sexologist and academic
Charles W. Whipple (1805-1856), American lawyer, politician and Chief Justice of the Michigan Supreme Court
Clara Whipple (1887–1932), silent film actress
Diane Whipple (1968–2001), American victim of a fatal dog attack
Dorothy Whipple (1893–1966), English writer of popular fiction
Edwin Percy Whipple (1819–1886), American essayist and critic
Frances Harriet Whipple Green McDougall, née Whipple (1805–1878), abolitionist, poet, novelist, editor, botanist, spiritualist medium, and advocate of women's, voters', and workers' rights
Francis John Welsh Whipple (1876–1943), British mathematician and meteorologist
Fred Lawrence Whipple (1906–2004), American astronomer
George Whipple (1878–1976), American physician, biomedical researcher, Nobel Prize winner
George C. Whipple (1866–1924), American civil engineer and expert in the field of sanitary microbiology, inventor of Whipple's index and co-founder of the Harvard School of Public Health
Guy Montrose Whipple (1876–1941), American educational psychologist
Henry Benjamin Whipple (1822–1901), first Episcopal bishop of Minnesota, US
Inez Whipple Wilder (born Inez Luanne Whipple, 1871–1929), American zoologist
John Adams Whipple (1822–1891), American inventor and early photographer
Joseph Whipple (1662–1746), merchant in the Colony of Rhode Island and Providence Plantations and militia colonel
Joseph Whipple Jr. (1687–1750), merchant and deputy governor of the Colony of Rhode Island and Providence Plantations, son of the above
Joseph Whipple III (1725–1761), merchant and deputy governor of Rhode Island and Providence Plantations, son of the above
Mark Whipple (born 1957), American football player and coach
Mary Margaret Whipple (born 1940), American politician
Maurine Whipple (1903–1992), American novelist
Philippa Whipple, British barrister and judge
Prince Whipple (1750-1796), African-American slave and later freedman, participant in the American Revolution
Robert Stewart Whipple (1871–1953), businessman in the British scientific instrument trade, collector of science books and scientific instruments and author
Sam Whipple (1960-2002), American actor
Squire Whipple (1804–1888), American civil engineer known as the father of iron bridge building in America
Thomas Whipple Jr. (1787–1835), American politician
Walter Whipple (born 1943), translator
William Whipple (1730–1785), signatory of the United States Declaration of Independence